Basketballclub Winterthur is a Swiss professional basketball club based in Winterthur. Since the 2013–14 season, the team plays in the Swiss Basketball League (SBL), the top-tier league in Switzerland.
The club has 11 teams in various leagues for both males and females.

References

External links
Official website

Basketball teams in Switzerland
Winterthur